Kani Mam Seyyed (also Romanized as Kānī Mām Seyyed; also known as Kapaklū) is a village in Beygom Qaleh Rural District, in the Central District of Naqadeh County, West Azerbaijan Province, Iran. At the 2006 census, its population was 236, in 42 families.

References 

Populated places in Naqadeh County